Mahmudlu or Makhmudly or Makhmudlu may refer to:
a former name of Chaykend, Armenia
Mahmudlu, Jabrayil, Azerbaijan
Mahmudlu, Qubadli, Azerbaijan
Mahmudlu, Shamkir, Azerbaijan
Birinci Mahmudlu, Azerbaijan
İkinci Mahmudlu, Azerbaijan
Üçüncü Mahmudlu, Azerbaijan